Groeger is a surname. Notable people with the surname include:

Lena Groeger, American investigative journalist, graphic designer, and news application developer
Peter Groeger (1933–2018), German actor, director, and voice actor

See also
Greger

Surnames from given names